Spink County is a county in the U.S. state of South Dakota. As of the 2020 census, the population was 6,361. Its county seat is Redfield. The county was created in 1873, and was organized in 1879 within Dakota Territory.

Geography
The terrain of Spink County consists of rolling hills, dedicated to agriculture. The James River flows southerly through the central portion of the county. The terrain slopes to the south; its highest point is in its northeast corner, at 1,424' (434m) ASL.

Major highways

  U.S. Highway 212
  U.S. Highway 281
  South Dakota Highway 20
  South Dakota Highway 26
  South Dakota Highway 28
  South Dakota Highway 37

Protected area
 Fisher Grove State Park

Adjacent counties

 Brown County - north
 Day County - northeast
 Clark County - east
 Beadle County - south
 Hand County - southwest
 Faulk County - west

Lakes
 Alkali Lake
 Cottonwood Lake
 Twin Lakes

Demographics

2000 census
As of the 2000 United States Census, there were 7,454 people, 2,847 households, and 1,933 families in the county. The population density was 5 people per square mile (2/km2). There were 3,352 housing units at an average density of 2 per square mile (1/km2). The racial makeup of the county was 97.56% White, 0.21% Black or African American, 1.48% Native American, 0.09% Asian, 0.01% Pacific Islander, 0.12% from other races, and 0.52% from two or more races. 0.39% of the population were Hispanic or Latino of any race.

There were 2,847 households, out of which 30.60% had children under the age of 18 living with them, 58.60% were married couples living together, 6.10% had a female householder with no husband present, and 32.10% were non-families. 29.30% of all households were made up of individuals, and 15.80% had someone living alone who was 65 years of age or older.  The average household size was 2.45 and the average family size was 3.05.

The county population contained 25.60% under the age of 18, 6.70% from 18 to 24, 26.10% from 25 to 44, 22.60% from 45 to 64, and 18.90% who were 65 years of age or older. The median age was 40 years. For every 100 females there were 107.20 males. For every 100 females age 18 and over, there were 106.20 males.

The median income for a household in the county was $31,717, and the median income for a family was $37,114. Males had a median income of $25,065 versus $20,386 for females. The per capita income for the county was $15,728. About 10.20% of families and 12.80% of the population were below the poverty line, including 17.20% of those under age 18 and 9.80% of those age 65 or over.

Several Hutterite communities are in Spink County, including near Ashton and Stratford.

2010 census
As of the 2010 census, there were 6,415 people, 2,608 households, and 1,677 families in the county. The racial makeup of the county was 97.1% white, 1.2% American Indian, 0.3% black or African American, 0.1% Asian, 0.4% from other races, and 0.9% from two or more races. Those of Hispanic or Latino origin made up 1.1% of the population. In terms of ancestry, 52.6% were German, 11.6% were Norwegian, 10.0% were Irish, 9.2% were English, and 5.5% were American.

Of the 2,608 households, 26.5% had children under the age of 18 living with them, 53.4% were married couples living together, 6.4% had a female householder with no husband present, 35.7% were non-families, and 31.8% of all households were made up of individuals. The average household size was 2.30 and the average family size was 2.89. The median age was 44.4 years.

The median income for a household in the county was $45,000 and the median income for a family was $60,639. Males had a median income of $40,273 versus $26,139 for females. The per capita income for the county was $25,295. About 8.2% of families and 17.0% of the population were below the poverty line, including 19.0% of those under age 18 and 12.0% of those age 65 or over.

Communities

Cities

 Ashton
 Conde
 Doland
 Frankfort
 Mellette
 Redfield (county seat)

Towns

 Brentford
 Northville
 Tulare
 Turton

Census-designated places

 Camrose Colony
 Clark Colony
 Glendale Colony
 Hillside Colony
 Mansfield (partial)
 Spink Colony

Other unincorporated communities
 Athol
 Crandon

Townships

Antelope
Athol
Belle Plaine
Belmont
Benton
Beotia
Buffalo
Capitola
Clifton
Conde
Cornwall
Crandon
Exline
Frankfort
Garfield
Great Bend
Groveland
Harmony
Harrison
Jefferson
Lake
La Prairie
Lincoln
Lodi
Mellette
Northville
Olean
Prairie Center
Redfield
Richfield
Spring
Sumner
Tetonka
Three Rivers
Tulare
Turton
Union

Politics
Spink County was historically a swing county, but in the past few decades has become fairly Republican. In no national election since 1992 has the county selected the Democratic Party candidate (as of 2020).

See also
 National Register of Historic Places listings in Spink County, South Dakota

References

 
1879 establishments in Dakota Territory
Populated places established in 1879